Joshua Allen Eads, stage name Ginger Minj (born September 11, 1984), an American drag queen, actor, singer-songwriter, and reality television personality. After achieving recognition for placing as the runner-up on the seventh season of the reality television competition series RuPaul's Drag Race, Minj returned to compete on the second and sixth seasons of RuPaul's Drag Race All Stars. Minj has acted in three Netflix productions—the comedy feature film Dumplin' (2018), the animated series Super Drags, and RuPaul's fictional series AJ and the Queen, and has acted in numerous theatrical productions. Minj appeared in the 2022 film Hocus Pocus 2, the sequel to Hocus Pocus. Minj has released three studio albums—Sweet T (2016), Gummy Bear (2021), and Double Wide Diva (2021).

Early life
Eads was born in Lake County, Florida, and majored in theater at school. As a child, Eads had surgery for a bowel blockage. Their drag mother is retired Orlando performer Rusty Fawcett.

Career

Drag Race 
Ginger Minj competed on the seventh season of the reality television competition RuPaul's Drag Race, which was announced on March 2, 2015. Throughout the competition, Minj won three challenges, most notably the Snatch Game, portraying Adele (tying with Kennedy Davenport's portrayal of Little Richard). Minj's performance of Adele was later ranked as the sixth best Snatch Game performance in Drag Race "herstory" by Sam Damshenas of Gay Times. Minj ultimately lost to Violet Chachki in the final episode, placing as a runner-up alongside Pearl.

Minj was subsequently announced as one of ten contestants for the second season of RuPaul's Drag Race All Stars on June 17, 2016. Minj was eliminated in the third episode, placing eighth overall. Minj then appeared as a guest for the first challenge in the premiere episode of season eleven.

Following Drag Race, Minj embarked on several international drag tours. In 2016, Minj was a part of Battle of the Seasons rotating roster of queens. Minj hosted the Haters Roast tour, though controversially was later fired from the event. Minj later hosted Queens United in November 2017, a benefit put together by Phi Phi O'Hara in an effort to raise money for people affected by Hurricane Maria.

In April 2020, amid the coronavirus pandemic, Minj was announced as a featured cast member for the very first Digital Drag Fest, an online drag festival. Minj returned the following year for the second annual Digital Drag Fest, in May 2021.

On May 26, 2021, Minj was announced as a contestant for the sixth season of RuPaul's Drag Race All Stars. After winning a lip sync against Mayhem Miller in the fifth episode of the season, Minj won $30,000. Minj won another $20,000 in the eighth episode of the season, Snatch Game of Love, after winning a lip sync against Heidi N Closet and making her the second queen to win the Snatch Game twice, after BenDeLaCreme. Ginger Minj finished the season as a runner-up alongside Eureka! and Ra'Jah O'Hara, ultimately losing to Kylie Sonique Love.

Pageants 
Minj has competed in many pageants throughout their career, holding several titles including "Miss National Comedy Queen 2012" and "Miss Gay United States 2013".

Music 
Minj released their first single, "Ooh Lala Lala", on June 1, 2015. A second single, "Bad, Bad Boy", was released on October 21, 2016. Minj's debut album, Sweet T, was released in October 2016. The album consists of a mix of original songs and covers and features of variety of styles including pop, rock, dance, jazz, and soul. Minj also contributed to the compilation album Christmas Queens 3 in 2017.

Another album, Clown Fucker, was set to be released in December 2018, but was pushed back to early 2019, and, as of 2021, remains unreleased. On June 11, 2021, Ginger Minj announced her second studio album, Gummy Bear, would be released on June 25, 2021, with "Clown Fucker" as one its tracks. She performed the title track "Gummy Bear" on the first episode of All Stars 6. The album peaked at #2 on the iTunes Comedy Album Charts.

In September 2021, Minj released their third album, Double Wide Diva. The country album featured seven original songs and a cover of Garth Brooks' "Friends in Low Places". Minj co-wrote each original song on the album, six of which alongside Brandon Stansell and Jeffrey James with producer Aaron Aiken.

In May 2022, Ginger Minj will portray the voice of Puss Puss Dubois in Alaska's Drag: The Musical, a studio recording of a planned stage production about two rival drag bars that go head-to-head while struggling through financial troubles.

Acting 
Minj began their career as a child actor, acting in Christian films and books on tape. As an adult, Minj continued acting, starring in Clandestine Arts' production of Avenue Q. Minj performed with other All Stars 2 queens at the Trailblazer Honors for Harvey Fierstein as the only singing performer on July 7, 2016. Minj was with Katya and Alyssa Edwards on commercial bumpers for a Mama's Family marathon for the Logo channel.

In 2014, Minj played Mrs. Lovett in Sweeney Todd at Orlando’s Clandestine-Arts. The casting initially lead to a cease-and-desist order in response to her casting, but this was resolved when a video of Ginger performing the role was sent to composer/lyricist Stephen Sondheim, who personally signed off on her performance.

Minj voiced the character Lemon Chiffon in the 2018 Netflix original series Super Drags.

In 2018, Minj starred in the Netflix musical comedy feature film Dumplin'. In 2020, Minj portrayed Tommy and drag queen Fanny Pak on the Netflix comedy AJ and the Queen, alongside RuPaul, in the episode "Fort Worth".

In August 2020, Minj starred in Drama at Drag Brunch: The Slaying of the Sequin Sisters, the fifth installment of the virtual interactive Broadway Murder Mystery story, portraying the role of Casey Closed.

Other ventures
In October 2021, Minj signed a six-figure book deal with Atria Books to publish her first book, "Southern Fried Sass". In August 2022, she will headline the 40th annual Northalsted Market Days, an annual LGBTQ-friendly street festival.

Personal life
Minj is from Florida, and was married to Ceejay Russell by Michelle Visage at a DragCon convention in 2017.

In an episode of RuPaul's Drag Race: Untucked, Minj stated that they are genderfluid/non-binary, stating that growing up they never knew if they were a boy or a girl and when they discovered genderfluidity and non-binary they finally felt seen.

Discography

Studio albums

Singles

As featured artist

Other appearances

Filmography

Film credits

Television credits

Theatre

Music videos

Web series

References

External links

 
 
 Joshua Allan Eads at IMDb
 Ginger Minj discography at Discogs

1984 births
Living people
American drag queens
LGBT male actors
LGBT people from Florida
Male actors from Florida
People from Leesburg, Florida
Ginger Minj
Ginger Minj
Non-binary drag performers
Genderfluid people